Athis clitarcha is a moth in the Castniidae family. It is found in Panama, Nicaragua, Costa Rica and Honduras.

References

Moths described in 1877
Castniidae